Elections were held in Mimaropa for seats in the House of Representatives of the Philippines on May 9, 2016.

Summary

Marinduque
Regina Ongsiako Reyes was the congresswoman from June 30, 2013 - February 1, 2016. Reyes was disqualified by the Supreme Court due to issues with her citizenship. Lord Allan Jay Q. Velasco was sworn on February 1, 2016, becoming the incumbent representative.

Occidental Mindoro
Josephine Y. Ramirez-Sato is the incumbent.

Oriental Mindoro
Each of Oriental Mindoro's two legislative districts will elect each representative to the House of Representatives. The candidate with the highest number of votes wins the seat.

1st District
Paulino Salvador C. Leachon is the incumbent.

2nd District
Reynaldo V. Umali is the incumbent

Palawan
Each of Palawan's three legislative districts will elect each representative to the House of Representatives. The candidate with the highest number of votes wins the seat.

1st District
Franz Josef George E. Alvarez is the incumbent.

2nd District
Frederick F. Abueg is the incumbent and running unopposed

3rd District
Douglas S. Hagedorn is the incumbent.

Romblon
Eleandro Jesus Madrona is the incumbent but ineligible for reelection. His party nominated his brother Emmanuel Madrona.

References

External links
COMELEC - Official website of the Philippine Commission on Elections (COMELEC)
NAMFREL - Official website of National Movement for Free Elections (NAMFREL)
PPCRV - Official website of the Parish Pastoral Council for Responsible Voting (PPCRV)

2016 Philippine general election
Lower house elections in Mimaropa